Samuel Ojebode (14 July 1944 – 4 July 2012) was a Nigerian footballer.

Career
Ojebode played for Shooting Stars, where he won the 1976 African Cup Winners' Cup; he also captained the Nigerian national side in three matches at the 1976 African Cup of Nations. He appeared in four FIFA World Cup qualifying matches.

References

1944 births
2012 deaths
Nigerian footballers
Nigeria international footballers
1976 African Cup of Nations players
Association football fullbacks
Sportspeople from Oyo State